Rosenborg Ballklub is an association football club based in Trondheim, Norway. The most successful club in Norway, Rosenborg has won the Norwegian Premier League 22 times and the Norwegian Football Cup 9 times. Although founded in 1917, it was not permitted to play in matches sanctioned by the Football Association of Norway until 1928. Rosenborg joined the top league in 1967 and won it in the club's inaugural top tier season. It has only spent one season outside the top tier since, which was in 1978.

Viking is the club with which Rosenborg has played the most, in 41 seasons. It is also the club which Rosenborg has drawn and lost against the most—28 and 26 times, respectively. With 40 seasons, Brann has played the second-most times and is the club Rosenborg has beat the most times. Rosenborg's main rivalries are against Brann and Molde. Strindheim is the only other team from Trondheim that Rosenborg has played against in the top league. The two groundshared Lerkendal Stadium in Strindheim's top-league 1984 and 1995 seasons.

SK Haugar, which only played in the same division as Rosenborg in 1981, is the only team which has beaten Rosenborg more times than Rosenborg has beaten it. Haugar and Vard are the only teams against which Rosenborg holds a negative goal difference. Along with Nessegutten, Haugar is the only team Rosenborg has never beaten. Conversely, Rosenborg has won every league match against Djerv 1919, Os, Pors and Stjørdals-Blink; Rosenborg holds a clean sheet against the latter three. Nessegutten and Stjørdals-Blink are the only teams Rosenborg has exclusively played while in the Second Division.

League record since 1967
The following is a record of results against all clubs Rosenborg BK has played in the domestic league from the 1967 season and onwards. For all seasons except 1978, this represented the teams in the Norwegian First Division and from 1991 the Norwegian Premier League, while for 1978 this represents the Second Division. The table includes games played (P), games won (W), games drawn (D), games lost (L), goals for (GF), goals against (GA) and the winning percentage (Win%), in addition to the first and last years the two clubs met in the league. The statistics are complete as of the end of the 2012 season.

References
General

Specific

League record by opponent
Rosenborg BK